is the title of several Japanese films based on the Japanese novel Quicksand written by Jun'ichirō Tanizaki in 1928.

The theme is sexual excess, and includes homosexuality between women. It was filmed in 1964, 1983, 1998 and 2006 in Japan.

Story
Sonoko, a bored married woman, falls for a fellow art student, the young and beautiful Mitsuko. The relationship develops and starts to affect and involve their partners.

1964 film
Cast and staff
Ayako Wakao as Mitsuko Tokumitsu
Kyōko Kishida as Sonoko Kakiuchi
Eiji Funakoshi as Kotaro Kakiuchi
Yūsuke Kawazu as Eijirō Watanuki
director: Yasuzo Masumura
writer: Kaneto Shindō

1983 version
Cast and staff
Kanako Higuchi as Mitsuko Sido
Haruna Takase as Sonoko Kakiuchi
Yoshio Harada as Kotaro Kakiuchi
director: Hiroto Yokoyama

1998 version
Cast and staff
Kaori Sakagami as Sonoko
Tomoko Mayumi as Mitsuko
Sei Hiraizumi as Kotaro Kikiuchi
Director: Mitsunori Hattori

2006 version
Cast and staff
Fujiko as Mitsuko Sido
Cosmosco as Sonoko
Director and writer: Noboru Iguchi

See also
Historical use of manji (卍) in Japan
The Berlin Affair
List of lesbian, gay, bisexual or transgender-related films

External links
卍 (Manji) 1964 at the IMDb
卍 (Manji) 1964 on allmovie
卍 (Manji) 1983 at the IMDb
卍 (Manji) 2006 at the IMDb
2006 Official Site 

2006 films
Films based on works by Jun'ichirō Tanizaki
Japanese erotic films
2000s Japanese-language films
Japanese LGBT-related films
Japanese sex comedy films
Lesbian-related films
1964 LGBT-related films
1983 LGBT-related films
1983 films
1998 LGBT-related films
1998 films
2006 LGBT-related films
1960s Japanese films
1980s Japanese films
1990s Japanese films
2000s Japanese films